Ila Bêka is a contemporary Italian artist, filmmaker and producer living in Paris. Ila Bêka is part of the artist duo Bêka & Lemoine.

Ila Bêka, together with Louise Lemoine, "are two of the foremost architectural artists working today. Their films focus on the relationship of people and design, emphasising the presence of everyday life within some of the most iconic architectural projects of recent decades". Bêka & Lemoine's complete work (16 films) was acquired in 2016 by MoMA, Museum of Modern Art in New York, and is now part of its permanent collection. The acquisition of a complete work by MoMA, Museum of Modern Art is an extremely rare event for a living artist.

Life and career 
Ila Bêka trained as an architect with a degree from the Università Iuav di Venezia of Venice and the École Nationale Supérieure d'Architecture de Paris-Belleville, where he studied with Aldo Rossi, Manfredo Tafuri, Vittorio Gregotti, Massimo Cacciari, Bernardo Secchi, Gino Valle, Ugo La Pietra, Henri Ciriani and Jacques Lucan.

Since 2005 he has been working in collaboration with Louise Lemoine with whom he founded the research and creation platform Bêka & Lemoine. Described by The New York Times as "cult figures in the European architecture world", Bêka and Lemoine focus their work on experimental new narrative and cinematographic forms in relation to contemporary architecture. 
Koolhaas Houselife, the first film Ila Bêka co-directed with Lemoine in 2008, has been acclaimed by the international critique as "The architectural cult movie".

Ila Bêka has been invited to lecture and present his films at many international cultural institutions and prestigious universities such as Venice Biennale (2008, 2010, 2014), MoMA (New-York), Metropolitan Museum of Art (New-York), Centre Pompidou (Paris), Palais de Tokyo (Paris), Barbican Art Gallery (London), Canadian Centre for Architecture (Montréal), NAi (Rotterdam, NL), MAXXI (Rome), SALT (Istanbul), Harvard GSD, Architectural Association School of Architecture (London), Mextropoli (Mexico).

According to ArchDaily, one of the most visited architecture websites worldwide, their films "alter the face of architectural criticism".

Ila Bêka is currently teaching Diploma 16 at AA School, Architectural Association School of Architecture in London.

Filmography

2000: Millimetraggi  (168 x 3min) - Short Film - Best Film at Festival du Film Très Court de Paris
2001: Colomba  (2min) - Short Film - Best Film at Venice International Short Film Festival in Venice
2001: In Utero  (11min) - Short Film - Official Selection at International Critic's Week at Cannes Film Festival
2002: L'uomo dei numeri  (5,30min) - Documentary
2003: I have seen my mother dancing in the clouds  (6min) - Short Film - Best International Short Film at 21 Torino Film Festival
2004: Salome & the seven heads (6min) - Video Installation
2004: Trilogy: Buongiorno (5min), Buonasera (5min), Buonanotte (5min) - 3 Short Films - Special Mention at Nastri d'Argento, Italy.
2005: Quodlibet  (84min) - Feature Film - Official Selection at 58th Locarno International Film Festival
2005: "A Balare", a trilogy: "Frassinetti  (62min), Pilastro (61min), Italicus (60min) - Documentaries
2006: Passero sublime (9min) - Video installation
2006: Mind scraping (5min) - Video installation, Contagion (5min) - Video installation, Reminiscenza onirica (5min) - Video installation
2006: Ventre (5min) - Video installation - Best Film at Festival Internazionale Cinema d'Arte di Milano
2007: Monsieur et Madame Pelletret (2 x 6min) - Video installation
2007: Testamento della Memoria  (38min) - Documentary
2008: Koolhaas Houselife (58min) - Documentary - Official Selection at 8th Venice Biennale of Architecture
2010: Sound of Space (6min) - Video installation
2010: "Inside Piano": The Submarine (39min), "The little Beaubourg (26min), "The power of silence (34min)  - 3 Documentaries
2012: Natural Histories (11min) - Video installation
2013: Pomerol, Herzog & de Meuron (51min) - Documentary
2013: Xmas Meier (51min) - Documentary
2013: Gehry's Vertigo, (48min) - Documentary - Official Selection at 10th Venice Biennale of Architecture (extract)
2013: Living Architectures Zip (60min) - Documentary - Best Film at ArchFilmLund Festival, Sweden
2013: 25bis (46min) - Documentary
2014: La Maddalena (12min) - Video installation - Official Selection at 14th Venice Biennale of Architecture 
2014: La Maddalena Chair (25min) - Video installation - Official Selection at 14th Venice Biennale of Architecture 
2014: Alfred, une nuit vénitienne (70min) - Documentary
2014: 24 heures sur place (90min) - Documentary - Special Jury Prize at 32nd Torino Film Festival
2014: L'expérience du vide (45min) - Documentary
2014: Barbicania (90min) - Documentary - Art project commissioned by Barbican Centre
2015: The Infinite Happiness (85min) - Documentary
2015: Spiriti (15x3min circa)- Video installation- Art project commissioned by Fondazione Prada, Milano
2016: Voyage autour de la Lune (75min) - Documentary
2016: Selling Dreams (25min + 12min) - Video installation - Official Selection Oslo Triennale
2017: Moriyama-San (63min) - Documentary - Best Prize at Architecture Film Festival London
2019: Butohouse (34min) - Documentary - International Premiere at DocAviv Film Festival
2017-2020: Homo Urbanus (10 x 55min) - Video installation - Official Selection Seoul Biennale and Agora Biennale in Bordeaux
2020: Tokyo Ride (90min) - Documentary - Artistic Vision Award, Depth of Field Competition - Best Prize - Docaviv Film Festival, 2020
2021: Oslavia, The Cave of the Past Future (17min) - Video installation - World premiere at MAXXI Museum in  Rome

Teaching 
 In 2019-2022 he taught the Diploma Unit "Homo Urbanus, Laboratory for Sensitive Observers" at AA School, Architectural Association School of Architecture in London.
In 2019-2021 he taught the course "Filming Architecture" at the AAM, the Accademia di Architettura di Mendrisio, in Switzerland.
 In 2021 he taught The Berlage Theory Master Class "A Journey Round My Room" at The Berlage Center for Advanced Studies in Architecture and Urban Design, in Delft.
In 2020 he taught the course "MAXXI Architecture Film Summer School" at MAXXI The National Museum of XXI Century Arts, Rome, IT.
In 2019-2020 he taught the course "Voyage autour de ma chambre" at HEAD, Haute École d'art et de design de Genève.
In 2017 he taught the course "The Emotion of Space" at Domaine de Boisbuchet in Lessac, France.
In 2016 and 2015 he taught the course "Filming Architecture" with Marco Müller and Louise Lemoine at the AAM, the Accademia di Architettura di Mendrisio, in Switzerland.
In 2014 and 2013 he taught the course "Cinema & Architecture" at GSAPP Columbia University for the New York/Paris program.

Recognition 
MoMA, Museum of Modern Art in New York: The complete work (16 films) of Ila Bêka and Louise Lemoine has been acquired for the permanent collection.
CNAP, Centre National des Arts Plastiques: "Koolhaas Houselife" and "La Maddalena" have been acquired for the permanent collection.
FRAC Centre, Orléans: "Butohouse", "Moriyama-San", "The Infinite Happiness", "Selling Dreams", "Gehry's Vertigo" have been acquired for the permanent collection.
Awarded by Metropolis (architecture magazine) as Game Changer 2015.
Artist in residence at Villa Kujoyama in Kyoto, Japan, 2018.
Rome Prize Italian Fellow at American Academy in Rome, Italy, 2018.
Selected by Icon Design as one of the 100 most talented personalities in the world in 2017.
Presented by the Metropolitan Museum of Art as one of the “Most exciting and critical design project of the year 2016”.
Prix d'Honneur FILAF 2020, Festival International du Livre d’Art et du Film, Perpignan, 2020.

Awards 
Prix d'Honneur - FILAF / Festival International du Livre d'Art et du Film, Perpignan, 2020: Bêka & Lemoine
Best Film at MDFF, Milano Design Film Festival 2020: "Tokyo Ride"
Artistic Vision Award at Docaviv Film Festival 2020: "Tokyo Ride"
Best Film at Architecture Film Festival London 2019: "Moriyama-San"
Best Film at Arquiteturas Film Festival Lisboa 2019: "Moriyama-San"
Best Prize, Arqfilmfest, Santiago, Chile, 2018:  "Moriyama-San"
Best Prize, FILAF D’OR, Festival International du Livre d’Art et du Film, Perpignan, 2018: "Moriyama-San"
Best Prize, FIFAAC, Bègles, France 2018: "Moriyama-San"
Special Jury Prize at 32nd Torino Film Festival, Torino, Italy, 2014: "24 Heures sur Place"
Best Architecture Documentaries for the film collection "Living Architectures" by the festival ArchFilmLund, 2013
Best International Short Film at 21 Torino Film Festival for "I have seen my mother dancing in the clouds"
Best Film at Festival du Film Très Court de Paris: "Millimetraggi"
Best Film at Venice International Short Film Festival in Venice: "Colomba"
Best Film at Jameson Award for "In Utero"
Best Film at Premio Troisi festival for "Millimetraggi"
Best Film at Festival Internazionale Cinema d'Arte di Milano: "Ventre"
Best Film at Premio Troisi festival for "Buongiorno"
Best Film at Maremetraggio Festival for "Millimetraggi"
Best Film at Interfilm Berlin Film Festival  Festival for "Buongiorno"
Special Prize of the Jury at Festival Sobra Arte 2015 (Lisbon): "La Maddalena"
Special Mention at Nastri d'Argento, Italy: "Buongiorno"

Published Dvd-Books
 Beka & Lemoine, 2016, DVD-Box Set Volume 1 & 2. 0701197948082
 The Infinite Happiness, 2016, DVD. 0701197948105
 Koolhaas Houselife, 2016, DVD. 0701197948112
 Koolhaas Houselife, 2008, .
 Koolhaas Houselife, 2013, .
 Pomerol, Herzog & de Meuron, 2013, .
 Xmas Meier, 2013, .
 Gehry's Vertigo, 2013, .
 Inside Piano, 2013, .
 Living Architectures, 2013, .

References

General References

 Ada Luise Huxtable, « Ingenious and Demanding », The Wall Street Journal, 2009-09-30 
 Christopher Hawthorne, « Tuesday at the Hammer: 'Koolhaas Houselife' », Los Angeles Times, 2010-08-03 
 Oliver Wainwright, Oslo architecture triennale: Airbnb cosplay for the gig economy nomad, The Guardian, 2016-09-12.
 Frédérique Hedelmann, « Guadalupe et l'architecte », Le Monde, 2008-09-22 
 Jean-Jacques Larrochelle, « Sacrées architectures », Le Monde, 2013-04-16 
 Patricia Zohn, « Culture Zohn: Life in the Koolhaas », The Huffington Post, 2010-07-30 .
 Patricia Zohn, « Culture Zohn: the 2014 Venice Biennale, parte due », Huffington Post, 2014-10-06 
 Rowan Moore, « 2014 Venice Architecture Biennale review: put yourself in their space… », The Guardian, 2014-06-08 .
 Oliver Wainwright, "Cathedrals of Culture", The Guardian, 2014-09-25. 
 Susanne Kippenberger, "Raumpatrouille", Der Tagesspiegel, 2015-10-22. 
 Elena Sommariva, "Voyage autour de la Lune", Domus, 2016-01-29 
 Karsten R.S. Ifversen, "8Tallet", Politiken, 2015-11-13 
 Isabelle Regnier, “Ila Bêka et Louise Lemoine : Nous filmons la ville à l’échelle des citadins que nous sommes”, Le Monde, 2020-10-07
 Wojciech Czaja, “Das ist der Homo Urbanus”, Der Standard, 2020-08-02
 Edwin Heathcote, “Living with a starchitect’s early work”, Financial Times, 2019-07-26
 Camille Juza, “Arpentez une maison d’architecte en regardant Koolhaas Houselife et envisagez votre intérieur d’un autre oeil”, France Culture, 2020-05-05
 Sara Marzullo, “L’umanità in città”, Il Tascabile, 2020-06-18

External links

 Archdaily 40 Best Architecture Docs

Living people
Architectural photographers
Italian film directors
Year of birth missing (living people)